Saramäki (Finnish; Starrbacka in Swedish) is a district in the Maaria-Paattinen ward of the city of Turku, in Finland. It is located to the north of the city, and is a very sparsely populated area.

The current population of Saramäki is 530, and it is decreasing at an annual rate of 1.70%. 16.60% of the district's population are under 15 years old, while 15.09% are over 65. The district's linguistic makeup is 95.28% Finnish, 0.75% Swedish, and 3.96% other.

See also
 Districts of Turku
 Districts of Turku by population

Districts of Turku